The elections to Amber Valley Borough Council in Derbyshire, England took place on Thursday 5th May 2022. One third of the council were up for election. The Conservatives increased their majority on the council whilst the Green Party also gained seats.

This election was the last by thirds election and the last before boundary changes proposed by the Local Government Boundary Commission came into effect at the 2023 election. Councillors elected this year served for a period of one year.

Results

Council Composition
Following the last election in 2021, the composition of the council was:

After the election, the composition of the council was:

Ward Results 

Percentage change is from the 2018 Amber Valley Borough Council Election.

Alfreton

Belper East

Belper South

Codnor and Waingroves

Duffield

Heanor and Loscoe

Heanor East

Heanor West

Ironville and Riddings

Kilburn, Denby and Holbrook

Langley Mill and Aldercar

Ripley

Shipley Park, Horsley and Horsley Woodhouse

Somercotes

Swanwick

References

Amber Valley
Amber Valley Borough Council elections
2020s in Derbyshire